Peters Township High School is a public high school in McMurray, Pennsylvania, United States. The current building was built in 2021. This new building was constructed just up the road from the old school, and was constructed at a cost of $83,175,452. The new building opened to students on January 19, 2021. The old building was built in 1968 and renovated in 1981. In January 2001, a 16-month, $24 million renovation was completed at the former building. The former building was renovated at a cost of $16,365,325, and now serves as Peters Township Middle School. The high school includes students from grades 9 through 12 and is located about 15 miles south of Pittsburgh. 

The 2012 film The Perks of Being A Wallflower filmed its school scenes at the old building.

Notable alumni 
 Steve Bell - professional soccer player and broadcaster
 Jocelyn Benson - 43rd Secretary of State of Michigan
 Matt Clackson - ice hockey player
 Stephanie D'Abruzzo - actress and puppeteer
 Christian Hanson - ice hockey player
 Michael Maniaci - opera singer
 Shea Marshall - musician
 Chris Peters - professional baseball player
 Alison Riske - tennis player
 Brian Simmons - professional baseball player
 Natalie Palamides - comedian
John-Henry Krueger - Olympic speed skater

Sports 
 Cheerleading
 Cross Country
 Field Hockey
 Football
 Golf
 Soccer
 Tennis
 Volleyball
 Basketball
 Swimming and Diving
 Wrestling
 Baseball
 Lacrosse
 Softball
 Track

References

External links 
 

Public high schools in Pennsylvania
Schools in Washington County, Pennsylvania
1968 establishments in Pennsylvania